James Moore "Big Jim" Tatum (July 22, 1913 – July 23, 1959) was an American football and baseball player and coach. Tatum served as the head football coach at the University of North Carolina at Chapel Hill (1942, 1956–1958), the University of Oklahoma (1946), and the University of Maryland, College Park (1947–1955), compiling a career college football record of 100–35–7. His 1953 Maryland team won a national title. As a head coach, he employed the split-T formation with great success, a system he had learned as an assistant under Don Faurot at the Iowa Pre-Flight School during World War II. Tatum was also the head baseball coach at Cornell University from 1937 to 1939, tallying a mark of 20–40–1. Tatum's career was cut short by his untimely death in 1959. He was inducted into the College Football Hall of Fame as a coach in 1984.

Early life and college playing career
Tatum was born in McColl, South Carolina on July 22, 1913. He attended the University of North Carolina at Chapel Hill, where he played college football as a tackle under head coach Carl Snavely. Tatum was named to the All-Southern Conference team as a senior in 1935.

Tatum played minor league baseball as a catcher for the Kinston Eagles. The 6 feet, 3 inches and 230 pounds Tatum had the nicknames "Big Jim" and "Sunny Jim".

In September 1935, Tatum participated in training camp with the New York Giants of the National Football League at Blue Hill Country Club.

Coaching career

Cornell

In 1936, Tatum followed his football coach at North Carolina, Carl Snavely, to Cornell University where he became Snavely's assistant football coach and also the head baseball coach for three seasons before returning to North Carolina in 1939. During this time, Tatum played minor league baseball in the class "D" Coastal Plain League with the Tarboro Serpents in 1937 and the Snow Hill Billies in 1938 and 1939.

Military service

Tatum enlisted in the United States Navy after one season as the head coach at North Carolina following Raymond Wolf's departure for naval service in 1941. He was assigned to the Iowa Pre-Flight school where he was an assistant coach for Don Faurot, the Missouri Tigers head coach and the inventor of the Split-T offense. Tatum used this offensive scheme with great success throughout his later career.

Oklahoma

After World War II, Tatum accepted a position as the head coach at the University of Oklahoma. He compiled an 8–3 in 1946 record before accepting the head coaching position at the University of Maryland. Bud Wilkinson, a fellow assistant coach at the Iowa Pre-Flight School, was one of his assistants at Oklahoma and was promoted to head coach when Tatum left for Maryland.

Maryland

At Maryland, Tatum compiled a 73–15–4 record for an .815 winning percentage. Maryland was undefeated in the 1951 season at 10–0, upsetting the top-ranked Tennessee Volunteers in the 1952 Sugar Bowl, 28–13. Tatum's 1953 team won a national championship. That season, Tatum was voted AFCA Coach of the Year. His Maryland teams won conference co-championships in 1951 in the Southern Conference and in 1953 and 1955 in the Atlantic Coast Conference. In addition to playing in the Sugar Bowl, Maryland also played twice each in the Gator Bowl and the Orange Bowl during Tatum's tenure.

North Carolina

In 1942 and from 1956 to 1958, Tatum served as the head football coach at his alma mater, the University of North Carolina. There he compiled a 19–17–3 record; two 1956 wins were later forfeited for use of an ineligible player. Tatum had originally returned to North Carolina to coach the freshmen football team in 1939 after spending time as an assistant at Cornell University. His first stint is notable for his recruitment of Felix "Doc" Blanchard, a son of one of his cousins, who played on the freshman team before enlisting and later starring as "Mr. Inside" for Army. He left his first tenure as head coach after the 1942 season to enlist in the Navy during World War II. His second tenure at North Carolina was cut short due to his untimely death.

Tatum died on July 23, 1959 in Chapel Hill, North Carolina at the age of 46. He had contracted an infection on July 13, and entered the hospital on July 18. On the day of his death, he fell into a coma in the afternoon and never regained consciousness. He was declared dead at 11:40 p.m. His ailment was later determined to be a rickettsial disease "similar to typhus and Rocky Mountain spotted fever". He was buried in Old Chapel Hill Cemetery.

Legacy
Himself a pupil of split T innovator Don Faurot, Tatum's coaching tree included the following assistants who later held head coaching positions of their own:
George Barclay, North Carolina
Walter Driskill, Baltimore Colts
Warren Giese, South Carolina
Jack Hennemier, Calgary Stampeders
Jim Hickey, North Carolina
Bill Meek, Houston
Tommy Mont, Maryland
Bob Ward, Maryland
Bud Wilkinson, Oklahoma

A number of Tatum's players also went on to become head coaches:
Dee Andros, Oregon State and Idaho
Dick Bielski, Washington Federals
John Idzik, Detroit
Jim LaRue, Arizona
Dick Modzelewski, Cleveland Browns
Dick Nolan, San Francisco 49ers and New Orleans Saints
Jim Owens, Washington
Darrell Royal, Texas
Wade Walker, Mississippi State
Ron Waller, San Diego Chargers
Bob Ward, Maryland

Nearly every year since 1979, the Atlantic Coast Conference has awarded the Jim Tatum Award to the conference's football player who most exemplifies Tatum's strong belief in the concept of the student-athlete. The 2022 recipient is Dillan Gibbons, a graduate student-athlete earning his MBA from Florida State University.

Head coaching record

Notes

References

External links
 
 

1913 births
1959 deaths
American football tackles
Baseball catchers
Cornell Big Red baseball coaches
Cornell Big Red football coaches
Iowa Pre-Flight Seahawks football coaches
Maryland Terrapins football coaches
Maryland Terrapins athletic directors
North Carolina Tar Heels baseball players
North Carolina Tar Heels football coaches
North Carolina Tar Heels football players
Oklahoma Sooners football coaches
Minor league baseball players
College Football Hall of Fame inductees
United States Navy personnel of World War II
People from Marlboro County, South Carolina
Infectious disease deaths in North Carolina
Military personnel from South Carolina